United Nations Security Council resolution 1476, adopted unanimously on 24 April 2003, after recalling all previous resolutions on Iraq, including resolutions 661 (1991), 986 (1995), 1409 (2002), 1454 (2002) and 1472 (2003) concerning the provision of humanitarian aid to the Iraqi people, the council extended the Oil-for-Food Programme until 3 June 2003.

The extension was enacted under Chapter VII of the United Nations Charter and was subject to further renewals by the council. The previous resolution concerning this topic gave the Secretary-General of the United Nations more authority to administer the Programme. By the time of the adoption of Resolution 1476, the value of shippable priority items to Iraq reached US$548.6 million.

See also
 Gulf War
 Invasion of Kuwait
 Sanctions against Iraq
 Iraq War
 List of United Nations Security Council Resolutions 1401 to 1500 (2002–2003)

References

External links
 
Text of the Resolution at undocs.org

 1476
2003 in Iraq
 1476
April 2003 events